Wiedemannia aequilobata is a species of dance flies, in the fly family Empididae.

References

Insects described in 1964
Diptera of Europe
Wiedemannia